The Bishop of Lindsey was a prelate who administered an Anglo-Saxon diocese between the 7th and 11th centuries. The episcopal title took its name after the ancient Kingdom of Lindsey.

History
The diocese of Lindsey (Lindine) was established when the large Diocese of Mercia was divided in the late 7th century into the bishoprics of Lichfield and Leicester (for Mercia itself), Worcester (for the Hwicce), Hereford (for the Magonsæte), and Lindsey (for the Lindisfaras).

The bishop's seat at Sidnacester (Syddensis) has been placed, by various commentators, at Caistor, Louth, Horncastle and, most often, at Stow, all in present-day Lincolnshire, England. The location remains unknown. More recently Lincoln has been suggested as a possible site.

After an interruption by the Danish Viking invasions and establishment of the Danelaw in the 9th century, the see of Lindsey was resumed in the mid-10th century until it was united with the bishopric of Dorchester in the early 11th century.

List of bishops

References

External links
Episcopal succession in Anglo-Saxon England

 
Religion in Lincolnshire